Ben Sowrey (born 2 May 1991) is an English rugby union player who plays for Yorkshire Carnegie in the RFU Championship.

Sowrey first played professionally for Doncaster Knights before joining Rotherham Titans in the RFU Championship during the 2013-14 season.

On 22 February 2014, Sowrey made move to Worcester Warriors in the Aviva Premiership from the 2014-15 season. On 28 April 2016, Sowrey signed for Premiership rivals Newcastle Falcons ahead of the 2016-17 season.

Playing for Worcester Warriors Ben made 20 appearances, Warriors won the British and Irish cup and won the Championship League.
Ben made 29 appearances for Newcastle Falcons, 18 in the Aviva Premiership. In 2018 Newcastle finished 4th in the league and semifinals of the European Challenge Cup, and the semi final of the Anglo Welsh Cup.

On 4 July 2018, Sowrey signed for Wharfedale in the third division National League 1 from the 2018-19 season. On 19 September 2019, Sowrey signed a one-year deal to return to the RFU Championship with Yorkshire Carnegie for the 2019-20 season.

References

External links
Newcastle Falcons Profile
ESPN Profile

1991 births
Living people
Doncaster Knights players
English rugby union players
Leeds Tykes players
Newcastle Falcons players
People educated at Prince Henry's Grammar School, Otley
Rotherham Titans players
Rugby union players from Leeds
Worcester Warriors players
Rugby union hookers